West Middletown may refer to:

 Middletown, Ohio
 West Middletown, Pennsylvania (borough)
 West Middletown Township, Delaware County, Pennsylvania